The Cross Ranch Archeological District near Hensler, North Dakota is a  historic district that was listed on the National Register of Historic Places (NRHP) in 1985.  The listing included 149 contributing sites.

Among the sites in the district, Bagnell (32OL16) was seemingly occupied during the late sixteenth and early seventeenth centuries AD.  Houses excavated at the site have produced significant evidence of the architectural practices of the residents: posthole patterns and other features suggest that the houses represent a transition to the earthlodges found among area tribes during the historic period.

References

Archaeological sites on the National Register of Historic Places in North Dakota
Native American history of North Dakota
Historic districts on the National Register of Historic Places in North Dakota
National Register of Historic Places in Oliver County, North Dakota
Former Native American populated places in the United States